Ionia Township may refer to the following townships in the United States:

 Ionia Township, Michigan
 Ionia Township, Jewell County, Kansas